Kiran Shantaram (born 1942) is an Indian film personality and former Sheriff of Mumbai. He is the son of V. Shantaram and Jayashree. He is chairman of V. Shantaram foundation and head of Asian Film Foundation. He is also the chairman of Prabhat Chitra Mandal. He is the trustee of V. Shantaram trust that owns Plaza cinema, Mumbai and is also its general manager. He is the president of The Mercedes Benz Club of India. He is the chairman of Federation of Film Societies of India. He was a jury for the Feature films section of the 43rd National Film Festival, 1996.

Shantaram made his debut working as assistant director of the film Navrang; he was responsible for continuity shots and shot a fantasy song.

References

1942 births
Living people
Film directors from Mumbai
Sheriffs of Mumbai
Businesspeople from Mumbai
Shantaram family